José Julián de Aranguren, O.A.R. (16 February, 1801 – 18 April, 1861) was an Augustinian missionary who served as Archbishop of Manila from 1847 to 1861. He is the 22nd Archbishop of the Philippine archdiocese of the latin branch of the Catholic Church.

Known for being hard-working, honest, and economical, the Spanish prelate demonstrated empathy,  courage, and a terrific work ethic, qualities that inspired people to honor him and name a church and towns after him and his hometown. For instance, the Barasoain Church in Malolos, Bulacan, founded 31st August 1859, was named after his hometown in Spain. The Aranguren Village located in Capas, Tarlac, was likewise named after him. This village, however, subsequently became part of New Clark City in 2021. 

José Julián de Aranguren was born in Barasoain, a little town of Navarre, Spain, within the historical lands of the Basque Country. His father was Bernardo Aranguren of Cizur Mayor, Navarre and his mother was Nicolasa Leoz of Sada, Navarre. His three known siblings were: Juaquina Aranguren Rodriguez Hurtado, Maria Jesus Aranguren Huarte Mendicoa, and Angel Maria Aranguren.

At 17, the young José left the Navarre region of Valle de Orba and began studying in Zaragoza University. Here he pursued some Philosophy courses (Logic, Metaphysics, and Ethics) and of Science (Physics, Chemistry, and Mathematics). In this same university, during the years 1822 to 1824, he studied Civil Law to later enlist in the army. 

However, soon he will change the military career for the religious life.  In fact, in the College of Alfaro in La Rioja, he took on the priestly garments of the Augustinian Recollects on December 7, 1825, to begin his religious profession on December 8 of the following year. Once he obtained his diploma as professor of Sacred Theology, he took care of the formation and discipleship of the young aspirants to religious life, work that had to be interrupted in the month of April, 1829 when he was asked to lead a group of Spanish missionaries to be sent to the Philippines. 

Upon his arrival in Manila on 2 October, 1829, the young priest began to impart Theology classes in the Recollect Convent of San Nicolas Friary, located in Intramuros, Manila. Shortly after this, in May 1831, he left the Cathedral to study Tagalog with the parishioners of Taguig, Rizal, and in three months of practice and execution of the Catholic mission, with great precariousness of means, he started serving in Capas and Patling, towns surrounded by infidels, in the province of Tarlac. He began this mission in Tarlac on the 10th of August 1831.

On the 13th of April 1836, after a 50-year hiatus of the Recollect ministry in Zambales, he became the Parish Priest of Masinloc. The strong 18th-century Baroque church he constructed in the municipality was made of coral stone and lime. It still exists today and is being hailed as a Philippine National Cultural Treasure. 

In 1837, he became the Parish Priest of Baclayon in the province of Bohol. He beautified its La Purisima Concepcion de la Virgen Maria Parish Church, a church made of coral stones, founded by the Jesuits in 1596 but heavily renovated by the Augustinians in the 1800's. It, too, is now being hailed as a National Cultural Treasure.

In the Recollect Province of the Philippines, he became the provincial secretary for the incumbent Prior Provincial of the Recollect Friars in Masinloc (1834), Vicar of Zambales (1837), Foreign Vicar of the clergy in Manila, and in 1843, he was elected Prior Provincial of the Augustinian Recollects. 

Bishop José Julián de Aranguren had to resign from this last position because on November 13, 1845, the Queen of Spain, Isabel II, nominated him to be the Archbishop of Manila, and in a secret consistory dated January 9, 1846, Pope Pius IX, the pope who convoked the First Vatican Council and instituted the doctrine of papal infallibility, signed his appointment. Archbishop Aranguren's merits earned him the prestigious appointment  of Adviser to Her Majesty. Subsequently, Isabel II knighted him conferring him the Grand Cross of the Order of Isabel la Catolica. 

Isabel II, born 10 October 1830, was the firstborn of Ferdinand VII of Spain and of Maria Christina of the Two Sicilies, his fourth wife and niece. Isabel II's reign as queen of Spain started from 29 September 1833 when she was just 3 years old until 30 September 1868. Before her birth, Ferdinand VII issued a Pragmatic Sanction to ensure the succession of his firstborn daughter, due to his lack of a male heir.  

There was a recurring claim that the biological father of Archbishop Aranguren was the then 17-year old Ferdinand VII who later on took for himself the Spanish crown but this was never proven. In 1802, one year after the Archbishop was born, Ferdinand VII married his cousin Maria Antonieta of Naples. However, she died after three years and still childless. 

Ferdinand VII married four times all in all but only managed to produce two heirs, both female: Maria Isabel Luisa (later becoming Queen Isabel II of Spain), and Maria Luisa Fernanda who went on and married Antoine d' Orleans, the Duke of Montpensier, youngest son of King Louis Philippe of France.

Meanwhile, the Episcopal Consecration for Archbishop Aranguren was executed at The Augustinian Recollects Church, Intramuros, Manila, on January 31, 1847, taking possession of the archdiocese on February 7. His principal consecrator was the Bishop of Cebu, Romualdo Jimeno Ballesteros of the Dominican Order. His episcopal lineage can be traced as far back to Scipione Cardinal Rebiba, who was appointed Titular Patriarch of Constantinople in December 8, 1565. 

During 15 years of tenure, Archbishop José Julián de Aranguren, in addition to regularly visiting his mission stations and parishes, stood out for the practice of charitable ministry for the poor and the infirm, love for priests, interest in the cathedral beautification and improvement, zeal in pastoral visits (he visited almost all the parishes and mission stations of his vast archdiocese twice), reduction and evangelization of infidels, simplification of the archdiocesan administration, and interest in missions in China. 

As to his profitable works, Archbishop Aranguren proactively supported and participated in the founding of El Banco Español Filipina de Isabel II [now Bank of the Philippine Islands] the first bank established in both the Philippines and Southeast Asia. This pioneering bank provided credit to the National Treasury. It issued the Philippine Peso Fuerte, a precursor to the current Philippine peso. Today, the Bank of the Philippine Islands is one of the most profitable banks in the Philippines. It now has a network of almost 1,000 branches in the Philippines, Hongkong and Europe.

It is also worth highlighting the Archbishop's active participation in the war against Joloano pirates in the Philippines. The Spanish engaged the Joloano pirates frequently in the 1840s, sending out several fleets of warships and Spanish Army troops to the Balanguingui Island in the Sulu archipelago. It was rumored that after several Spanish expeditions to the island and its vicinities, in 1849, no more significant Joloano pirate force remained in the area.

Archbishop José Julián de Aranguren also invited the Carmelite Sisters of Charity to Manila out of his concern for ill people and for the education of the youth. This proved successful although the Sisters of Charity only arrived in Manila a few years after his demise in 1861. 

Among his achievements, the Archbishop was, for the most part,  acknowledged through upholding the integrity of the native secular clergy in the Philippines by defending their rights and interests. Following his death, his secretary, Father Pedro Pelaez, as vicar capitular of the archdiocese sede vacante, courageously took up the baton left by the late archbishop and continued his work. The current archbishop of Manila is Jose Cardinal Advincula who started serving his post on June 24, 2021. 

Archbishop José Julián de Aranguren died of chronic dysentery in Manila on April 18, 1861, and his mortal remains rest next to the main altar of the Manila Cathedral, the Minor Basilica and Metropolitan Cathedral of the Immaculate Conception. His, it can be argued,  was a life of exceptional missionary service for God and for God's own.

References

Cheney, D. (2015) Luis Antonio Gokim Cardinal Tagle [Online]. Available at http://www.catholic-hierarchy.org/bishop/btaglelag.html (Accessed 04/05/2016).
Cheney, D. (2015) Archbishop José Aranguren, O.A.R. [Online]. Available at http://www.catholic-hierarchy.org/bishop/barang.html (Accessed 04/05/2016).
Miguel, D. (2012) Recollect Bishops, Prefects and Apostolic Administrators [Online]. Available at http://oarhistory.blogspot.co.uk/ (Accessed 04/05/2016).

1801 births
1861 deaths
Roman Catholic archbishops of Manila
Spanish Roman Catholic archbishops
19th-century Roman Catholic archbishops in the Philippines